The Consensus 2007 College Basketball All-American team, as determined by aggregating the results of four major All-American teams.  To earn "consensus" status, a player must win honors from a majority of the following teams: the Associated Press, the USBWA, The Sporting News and the National Association of Basketball Coaches.

2007 Consensus All-America team

Individual All-America teams

AP Honorable Mention:

References

NCAA Men's Basketball All-Americans
All-Americans